Shant TV (Armenian: Շանթ հեռուստատեսություն) is a private television broadcasting company in Armenia. Shant TV was founded by Arthur Yezekyan in Gyumri, the second largest city of Armenia, in 1994. Shant TV launched a full 6 hour broadcasting schedule in May 1995.

History
The station was founded at a time of hunger for information programs and social tension in the country. This is the main reason why the newly founded TV company began specializing in the production of news and information programs from its beginning. In 2001, Shant TV moved to Yerevan, the capital of Armenia, and gained popularity and trust over the next three years. It started regular broadcasting, also in 2001.

Programming
The most popular shows on Shant TV include:
 The Surrogate Mother
 Slave of Love
 In The Army
 In The City
 Overview of Abroad
 Alien
 Ellen's Diary
 Secret Love
 Vitamin Club

Time-line
  1994 - Founded in Gyumri
  1995 - Shant TV has launched its full 6 hour broadcasting with every day Armenian TV programs system.
  1995 - Shant TV has launched a private weekly newspaper.
  1995/1996 - Temporary coding of the ether in terms of energy crisis.
  1997 - Start of production of humor and joke sketches and its realization among Armenians all over the world.
  1998 - Foundation of private radio station
  2001 - Moved to Yerevan, where it started regular broadcasting
  2002 - Shant TV acquired the right of broadcasting the Armenian version of the famous television show Who Wants to Be a Millionaire?. This television game was the first internationally acknowledged format in Armenia, acquired legally.
  2003 - Shant TV company went online and started online broadcasting
  2006 - Shant started TV serials
  2006-2011 - Shant TV broadcasts competition TV shows: Hay Superstar (Idols franchise), My name is..., X-Factor, Dance Show, Hidden Talent, So You Think You Can Dance?.

Web presence
Shant TV also launched an online TV forum:
www.forum.shanttv.com

References

External links
 

Television stations in Armenia
Armenian-language television stations
Television channels and stations established in 1994
Television networks in Armenia